Delphine Red Shirt (born 1957) is a Native American author and educator, who is an enrolled member of the Oglala Sioux Tribe of the Pine Ridge Reservation.

Early life and education
Delphine Red Shirt is Oglala Lakota from the Pine Ridge Indian reservation. She attended Holy Rosary High School (now Red Cloud Indian School), and Regis College (now Regis University), with a major in Accounting and a minor in History. She received her Master of Arts in Liberal Studies in Creative Writing from Wesleyan University, and her doctorate in American Indian Studies from the University of Arizona.

Career
Red Shirt has been a member of the United States Marine Corps, served as the Chairperson of the United Nations NGO Committee on the International Decade of the World's Indigenous People, and as the United Nations Representative for the Four Directions Council: International Indigenous Organization. As a visiting lecturer at Yale University, Connecticut College, and Wayne State University, she is currently a lecturer in Decolonized History and the Lakota language at Stanford University. She has continued to serve as a mentor and advisor to Native students.

Red Shirt has also authored three books: Bead On An Anthill: A Lakota Childhood, Turtle Lung Woman’s Granddaughter, and most recently, George Sword’s Warrior Narratives, which has been awarded the Labriola Center American Indian National Book Award from Arizona State University and the 2017 Electa Quinney Award for Published Stories from the University of Wisconsin-Milwaukee. Her work has been anthologized in various publications, including Tongue-Tied: The Lives of Multilingual Children in Public Education by Otto Santa Ana, and the Western Women's Reader: The Remarkable Writings of Women Who Shaped The American West, Spanning 300 Years. She continues to be a regular contributor to Lakota Country Times and has written for Native Sun News and Indian Country Today.

Bibliography
Turtle Lung Woman's Granddaughter. Lincoln: University of Nebraska Press, 1997.
Bead on an Anthill: A Lakota Childhood. Lincoln: University of Nebraska Press, 1997. .
George Sword's Warrior Narratives:Compositional Processes in Lakota Oral Tradition. Lincoln: University of Nebraska Press, 2016.

See also
List of writers from peoples indigenous to the Americas
Native American Studies

Notes

References
 Mihesuah, Devon A., ed. The American Indian Quarterly. Vol. 26, No. 4. Lincoln: University of Nebraska Press, Fall 2002. ISSN 0095-182X

External links
"Delphine Red Shirt, official site", URL accessed 07/22/06
"These Are Not Indians", URL accessed 07/29/07
"Richard H. Shaw Departs for Stanford Post", URL accessed 7/29/07

1957 births
Living people
American columnists
Oglala people
Wesleyan University alumni
Native American writers
Journalists from South Dakota
Journalists from Nebraska
People from Gordon, Nebraska
21st-century Native American women
21st-century Native Americans
Native American women writers